Legislative Assembly elections were held in Assam in two phases between 3 and 10 April 2006 to elect members from all 126 constituencies of the state . Following the election, the incumbent Chief Minister Tarun Gogoi formed his second ministry.

Schedule
The election schedule is as follows:

Results

Elected members

References

State Assembly elections in Assam
Assam